Pokkiri Thambi is a 1992 Indian Tamil-language thriller film directed by Senthilnathan. The film stars Anandaraj and Kaveri, with Vijayakumar, Janagaraj, Jayanthkumar, Balambika, Kumarimuthu, Bayilvan Ranganathan, Anuja, Kullamani, Boopathi Raja and King Kong playing supporting roles. It was released on 22 May 1992.

Plot 

In a remote village, many young women have mysteriously disappeared the night and their dead bodies are found the following day. Pannaiyar, the village chief, promises the villagers to find and punish the culprit. Thambidurai is an angry young man who works hard the day in Pannaiyar's farm and enjoys drinking arrack the night. He lives with his mother and his sister Selvi. Thereafter, Selvi and Pannaiyar's son Jayanthkumar fall in love with each other but Pannaiyar refuses to marry them and humiliates Thambidurai. A vengeful Thambidurai then sneaks into Pannaiyar's house the night and he forcefully rapes Kaveri, thinking that she is Pannaiyar's daughter.

At the village court, Kaveri reveals that her elder sister was found dead a few months ago in this village so she has come to their village to find the culprit. Kaveri was kidnapped that night and the abductor put her in Pannaiyar's house. Thambidurai who went this way raped her. Pannaiyar orders Thambidurai to marry her immediately and he marries her in front of the villagers. Later, Thambidurai finds out that the serial killer and serial rapist is none than Pannaiyar and he exposes Pannaiyar's true face to the villagers. Overcome by embarrassment, Pannaiyar commits suicide by drowning.

Cast 

Anandaraj as Thambidurai
Kaveri as Kaveri
Vijayakumar as Pannaiyar
Janagaraj as Rajamani
Jayanthkumar as Jayanthkumar
Balambika as Selvi
Kumarimuthu as Villager
Bayilvan Ranganathan as Villager
Anuja as Irulayee
Kullamani as Villager
Boopathi Raja as Maruthu
King Kong as Thambidurai's friend
Varalakshmi as Lakshmi
V. R. Thilagam as Thambidurai's mother
Pasi Sathya
Surekha
Premi as Villager
Usha Priya as Victim's mother
Lalitha Kumari as Maruthu's sister
Senthilnathan as Periya Karuppu

Soundtrack 
The music was composed by Deva.

Reception 
C. R. K. of Kalki said Anandaraj dominated the film from beginning to end.

References

External links 
 

1990s Tamil-language films
1992 films
1992 thriller films
Films scored by Deva (composer)
Indian thriller films